Nombre de Dios is a city and corregimiento in Santa Isabel District, Colón Province, Panama, on the Atlantic coast of Panama in the Colón Province. Founded as a Spanish colony in 1510 by Diego de Nicuesa, it was one of the first European settlements on the Isthmus of Panama. As of 2010 it had a population of 1,130 people.

History
Nombre de Dios is the oldest continuously inhabited European settlement in the continental Americas. Originally a major port of call for the Spanish treasure fleet, Nombre de Dios was the most significant port for shipping in the Americas between 1540 and 1580. After the opening of Potosí in 1546, silver was shipped north to Panama City and carried by mule train across the isthmus to Nombre de Dios for shipment to Havana and Spain. As Nombre de Dios was situated near an unhealthy swamp and was nearly impossible to fortify, it declined in importance. In June 1572 the English privateer Francis Drake sacked the colony and in April of the following year he ambushed the Spanish Silver Train, a mule convoy carrying a fortune in precious metals.  Drake captured the town again in 1595 but found little treasure, thereby missing 5 million pesos waiting off the Pacific side.  After that date the Spanish preferred to use Portobelo as their Caribbean port.

By 1580, Veracruz in present-day Mexico became a more important port. Mexican silver production increased steadily while South American production declined sharply after 1700. By 1600, Nombre de Dios had been all but abandoned by the Spanish. The town still exists, though it is much less populous than in the 16th century.

Its population as of 1990 was 1,028 and of 2000 was 1,053.

Culture
Nombre de Dios is mentioned by the poet Derek Walcott in The Prodigal:

The bay is also mentioned in Sir Henry Newbolt's poem "Drake's Drum", about a legend of Sir Francis Drake:

See also
Piracy in the Caribbean

References

Colonial Panama
Populated places established in 1510
Populated places in Colón Province
Corregimientos of Colón Province